Hillabahatchee Creek is a stream in the U.S. states of Alabama and Georgia. It is a tributary to the Chattahoochee River.

Hillabahatchee ("Hillabee Creek") derives its name from the Hillabee people.

References

Rivers of Georgia (U.S. state)
Rivers of Heard County, Georgia
Rivers of Alabama
Rivers of Randolph County, Alabama
Georgia placenames of Native American origin
Alabama placenames of Native American origin